Rebecca Harrower (born 6 June 1996) was a Canadian synchronized swimmer, Harrower joined the national team in 2014. Armstrong won a gold medal in the team artistic swimming category at the 2019 Pan American Games.  Harrower was a training member of Canada's national team in the lead-up to the delayed 2020 Summer Olympics which were postponed as a result of the COVID-19 pandemic.

References 

Living people
1996 births
Canadian synchronized swimmers
Artistic swimmers at the 2019 Pan American Games
Pan American Games gold medalists for Canada
Pan American Games medalists in synchronized swimming
Medalists at the 2019 Pan American Games
Swimmers from Edmonton
21st-century Canadian women